Karamoko or Karamokho is a West African name that may refer to
Given name
Karamokho Alfa (died c. 1751), African religious leader
Karamoko Cissé (born 1988), Guinean football forward 
Karamoko Dembele (born 2003), British football winger 
Karamoko Kéïta (born 1974), Malian football goalkeeper 

Surname
Awa Karamoko (born 1985), Ivorian handball player
Benjamin Karamoko (born 1995), Ivorian football defender 
Hamadou Karamoko (born 1995), French football defender 
Vasseko Karamoko (born 1987), French footballer
Aboubakar Karamoko (born 1999), Ivorian footballer